Coffee production in Ivory Coast is important for the economy of the country as coffee is the second largest export commodity of the country. It was the largest coffee producer in Africa in the 1970s and 1980s, and one of the largest robusta producers in the world. Today however, Ivorian coffee production has been far superseded by Vietnam and Brazil. It ranks 14th in the world ranking.

History
Coffee plants were introduced into the country in the 19th century by French colonizers. Following World War II, coffee production increased from 36,000 tons in 1945 to 112,500 tons in 1958. After Ivory Coast became independent (in 1960), coffee production peaked in the 1970s making it the third-largest coffee-producing country in the world, after Brazil and Colombia, before the civil war unsettled cultivation. Coffee production and policy are derived from the era when Ivory Coast was a colony of French West Africa. This has attracted French companies to invest in the sector.

Production
Ivory Coast produces mostly robusta coffee.

According to the FAOSTAT database of the United Nations Food and Agriculture Organization, production of "green" (i.e., unroasted) coffee beans in the Ivory Coast was the following (in tons):

Production of green robusta coffee output in the nation peaked at 380,000 tons in 2000. Production subsequently declined over more than a decade of upheaval in the country, particularly during the First Ivorian Civil War (2002–2007) and Second Ivorian Civil War (2010–2011). In 2014, the Ivorian agriculture minister announced a new annual production target of 400,000 tons of coffee by 2020, about four times its present rate.

References

Bibliography

Ivory Coast
Economy of Ivory Coast
Agriculture in Ivory Coast